Olearia stellulata is a species of flowering plant in the family Asteraceae and is endemic to south-eastern Australia. It is a shrub with lance-shaped or narrowly elliptic leaves, and white and yellow or mauve, daisy-like inflorescences.

Description
The upper surface of mature leaves is glabrous, the lower surface densely covered with yellowish, star-shaped hairs.

Taxonomy
This daisy was first formally described in 1806 by Jacques Labillardière who gave it the name Aster stellulatus in his Novae Hollandiae Plantarum Specimen. In 1836, Augustin Pyramus de Candolle changed the name to Olearia stellulata in his Prodromus Systematis Naturalis Regni Vegetabilis. The specific epithet (stellulata) means "small stars".

Distribution and habitat
Olearia stellulata is found in Victoria and Tasmania. In Victoria it is apparently confined to the Chapple Vale area in the Shire of Colac Otway and in Tasmania it is widespread and common in forests, sometimes intergrading with O. lirata and O. phlogopappa.

References

stellulata
Asterales of Australia
Flora of Victoria (Australia)
Flora of Tasmania
Plants described in 1806
Taxa named by Jacques Labillardière